Rüppell's Korhaan (Eupodotis rueppellii), also known as Rüppell's bustard, is a species of bird in the family Otididae. The species is a small bustard, only 60 cm long. The head and neck are grey, with black stripes down the throat (less marked in females), through the eye, and on the sides of the neck, and white cheeks. The body is sandy brown above, and white below. The legs are sandy yellow-brown. Rüppell's Korhaan received its name to recognize Wilhelm Rüppell, a German explorer, collector and naturalist. It is native to southwestern Africa in Angola and Namibia, Collar, N. J. "The bustards and their conservation." Bustard in Decline, Jaipur (1982): 244–255.  It is one of Namibia's 13 native birds found in the western part of the country. On overage they inhabit areas with low rainfall such as deserts, plains, and savannahs. Where their exceptionally senses play a major role in their security. It is most likely found in Namibrand nature reserve, Mirabib, Ganab in the Namib-Naukluft Park, Bloedkoppie, and in the Spitzkoppe surroundings.

Rüppell's Korhaan are usually monogamous but sometimes breed in large family groups. It lays eggs all year round with a peak season from February to May. Nest are made among rocks and stone with some occasional plant coverage. It can lay 1-3 eggs at a time that are incubated solely by the female. Rüppell's Korhaan are omnivorous, having a diet of mostly invertebrates such as small reptiles and termites and they also eat leaves and seeds. Eating is usually done by pecking the ground as they walk.

Bustards are highly susceptible to the loss or modification of habitat, nearly always as a result of increasing pressures from agriculture, hunting, poaching for sport and food, and disturbances especially during breading season. As a result of their elusiveness, natural shyness, large home ranges, combined with their camouflage have made them one of the most difficult groups to obtain any sufficient biological, population, or mortality data on. The conservation of these animals is almost entirely the responsibility of Namibia.

References

 del Hoyo, J., et al., eds. (1996). Handbook of the Birds of the World 3: 268–269. Lynx Edicions.
 Burger, Pompie. “Bird's-Eye View - Rüppell's Korhaan.” Travel News Namibia, 30 Sept. 2015, www.travelnewsnamibia.com/activities/birding/birds-eye-view-ruppells-korhaan/.
 Collar, N. J. "The bustards and their conservation." Bustard in Decline, Jaipur (1982): 244–255.
 “Eupodotis Rueppellii (Rüppell's Korhaan).” Biodiversity Explorer The Web of Life in Southern Africa, www.biodiversityexplorer.org/birds/otitidae/eupodotis_rueppellii.htm.
 “Ruppell's Korhaan | Namibia.” Cardboard Box Travel Shop, 1998, www.Namibian.org/travel/birds/ruppells-korhaan.html.

External links
 Rüppell's Korhaan - Species text in The Atlas of Southern African Birds

Eupodotis
Birds of Southern Africa
Birds described in 1856
Taxa named by Johan August Wahlberg
Taxonomy articles created by Polbot
Taxobox binomials not recognized by IUCN